Laura Bono (born 14 January 1979) is an Italian pop-rock singer-songwriter.

Background 
Born in Varese as Laura Bonometti, at very young age Bono started composing songs, making live performances in clubs and entering musical competitions for newcomers. The success came in 2005, when Bono won the "new artists" section of the Sanremo Music Festival with the song "Non credo nei miracoli". Outside of Italy, her first album had a significant success in Finland, where it entered the top ten; in Finland Bono also recorded a duet with Tomi Metsäketo, "Oggi ti amo", and she participated at the opening ceremony of the World Athletics Championships which were held in Helsinki in August 2005.

In 2006 Bono recorded the Spanish version of her debut album and was finalist in the musical show Music Farm. In 2010 her song "Tra noi l'immensità", first single of her third album La mia discreta compagnia, was chosen as the theme song of a Telecom commercial.  In 2013, after a three-year hiatus, she released the single "Fortissimo", a cover version of a Rita Pavone hit.

Discography 
Album 
 2005 - Laura Bono 
 2008 - S'intitola così  
 2010 - La mia discreta compagnia
 2015 – Segreto

References

External links  

 Laura Bono at Discogs

 

1979 births
Italian women singer-songwriters
Italian singer-songwriters
Living people
Musicians from Varese
Italian songwriters
Pop rock singers
Sanremo Music Festival winners of the newcomers section
21st-century Italian singers
21st-century Italian women singers